The Burkinabe ambassador in Washington, D. C. is the official representative of the Government in Ouagadougou to the Government of the United States.

List of representatives

Burkina Faso–United States relations

References 

 
United States
Burkina Faso